El Yuzbashi ('Captain') El Amin Effendi Hemeida EGM (born around 1900, probably in Sudan) was a soldier in the Sudan Defence Force.

In 1936 he was awarded the Medal of the Military Division of the Most Excellent Order of the British Empire, for Gallantry (the "Empire Gallantry Medal", EGM), "for conspicuous gallantry and devotion to duty in circumstances of very considerable personal danger". It was gazetted on 23 June 1936.

The citation read:

In September 1940, the medal was converted automatically to the newly created George Cross.

He died on 23 May 1973 and was reportedly cremated in the Sudan.

As of 2018, his medals remain in the ownership of his family; they were featured in an episode of the BBC television programme Antiques Roadshow on 24 February 2019.

References 

Recipients of the Empire Gallantry Medal
Sudan Defence Force officers
Year of birth uncertain
Place of birth missing
1973 deaths